Tanveer Akhtar (died 8 May 2021) was an Indian politician from Janata Dal (United) and was member of Bihar Legislative Council.

Biography
He previously served as vice-President of the Bihar unit of the Indian National Congress. He was also Jawaharlal Nehru University Students' Union President and Bihar Pradesh Youth Congress President earlier. He later joined Janata Dal (United) in Bihar. He died due to COVID-19 on 8 May 2021.

References

Indian National Congress politicians
2021 deaths
Year of birth missing
Members of the Bihar Legislative Council
Jawaharlal Nehru University Students' Union
Janata Dal (United) politicians
Deaths from the COVID-19 pandemic in India